Carrier Air Wing Eight (CVW-8), is a United States Navy aircraft carrier air wing based at Naval Air Station Oceana, Virginia. The air wing is attached to the aircraft carrier

Mission
To conduct carrier air warfare operations and assist in the planning, control, coordination and integration of nine air wing squadrons in support of carrier air warfare including; Interception and destruction of enemy aircraft and missiles in all-weather conditions to establish and maintain local air superiority. All-weather offensive air-to-surface attacks, Detection, localization, and destruction of enemy ships and submarines to establish and maintain local sea control. Aerial photographic, sighting, and electronic intelligence for naval and joint operations. Airborne early warning service to fleet forces and shore warning nets. Airborne electronic countermeasures. In-flight refueling operations to extend the range and the endurance of air wing aircraft and Search and rescue operations.

Subordinate units

CVW-8 consists of 8 Squadrons

History

1950s
CVG-8 was established on 9 April 1951 as Carrier Air Group Eight (CVG-8) (it was the second air group to carry the CVG-8 designation; the first CVG-8 existed from June 1943 to November 1945) and has been in continuous operation since that date. Most of the wing's squadrons were reserve squadrons. CVG-8 made its first deployment to the Mediterranean Sea aboard  in 1951–52.

1960s

Carrier Air Group 8 was assigned to Forrestal until mid-1966, making five deployments to the Mediterranean Sea. On 20 December 1963, CVG-8 was redesignated Carrier Air Wing 8 (CVW-8). The air wing was reassigned to the much smaller   in 1966, which necessitated the replacement of the F-4B Phantom II fighter with F-8D Crusaders. CVW-8 made three deployments to the Mediterranean Sea aboard Shangri-La.

1970s

From 5 March to 17 December 1970, CVW-8 made its first combat deployment to Vietnam. This was to be the last deployment of Shangri-La which was decommissioned in 1971. All of its squadrons were replaced and received the latest models of the F-4 Phantom II, A-7 Corsair II and A-6 Intruder. In 1971 America went to the Mediterranean Sea, again, before being deployed to Vietnam from 5 June 1972 to 24 March 1973. The wing returned to the Mediterranean aboard America in 1975, before being reassigned to the nuclear-powered  in 1975.

Iran

Between June 1976 and May 1980, CVW-8 embarked on board Nimitz for three Mediterranean deployments. CVW-8 made a special appearance in the 1980 movie The Final Countdown. During their third Mediterranean deployment and in response to the Iranian hostage crisis and the Soviet invasion of Afghanistan, Nimitz with CVW-8 embarked left Naples, Italy in January 1980 and sailed around the Cape of Good Hope into the Indian Ocean.  Established at "Gonzo Station,"  the air wing supported the Iranian hostage rescue attempt, Operation Eagle Claw, while remaining at-sea for more than 140 consecutive days.  Returning to the United States in May 1980, CVW-8 embarked once again in USS Nimitz for the North Atlantic NATO exercise "Teamwork 80" from August to November 1980.

1980s
CVW-8 embarked on Nimitz again in April 1981 for Caribbean operations, followed by another Sixth Fleet Mediterranean deployment.  It was during this deployment that two CVW-8 F-14s from Fighter Squadron 41 engaged and destroyed two Libyan Sukhoi Su-22 aircraft following an unprovoked air-to-air missile attack over the international waters of the Gulf of Sidra.

Lebanon
Returning to Norfolk, Virginia, CVW-8 embarked in the Navy's newest carrier,  for her maiden voyage in March 1982.  CVW-8 squadrons returned to Nimitz later in 1982 for Carrier Refresher Training followed by Caribbean operations and an extended Mediterranean deployment from November 1982 to May 1983 which included air operations in support of the multi-national force in Beirut, Lebanon.

In March 1985, CVW-8 embarked again on USS Nimitz for a Mediterranean deployment which included participation in several exercises including Distant Hammer, Poop Deck, and Bright Star.  During this deployment, USS Nimitz and CVW-8 were stationed off the coast of Beirut, Lebanon for 69 consecutive days during the terrorist hijacking of a TWA airliner.  The prompt response and threat of contingency strike operations by USS Nimitz and CVW-8 helped coerce the Iranian-backed terrorists into releasing their hostages.

In December 1986, CVW-8 embarked on USS Nimitz for the last time and deployed to the Mediterranean Sea.  At the end of this deployment USS Nimitz team sailed around the tip of South America as the carrier changed its homeport from Norfolk, Virginia to Everett, Washington. In June 1987, CVW-8 aircraft launched for the last time from USS Nimitz while off the coast of San Diego, California to return to their respective homeports.

In December 1988, CVW-8 embarked on Theodore Roosevelt for a Mediterranean deployment where they participated in ten NATO exercises. The air wing distinguished itself during this deployment by flying over 22,000 flight hours and 10,000 sorties without a mishap.

Gulf War
Following the August 1990 invasion of Kuwait by Iraqi armor and infantry forces, CVW-8 rapidly prepared for possible combat operations. In four short months, intense training enabled Theodore Roosevelt and CVW-8 to deploy on 28 December to join five other U.S. Carrier Battle Groups in the largest display of sea power since World War II for Operation Desert Storm.

After participating in combat operations in Iraq in support of Operations Desert Storm and Provide Comfort, CVW-8 returned home on 28 June 1991 for a brief standdown.  During the winter of 1992, CVW-8 provided opposition forces from Roosevelt Roads, Puerto Rico in support of Carrier Battle Group training.  In July 1992, the air wing was the first Air Wing to receive and incorporate a Marine Corps FA-18C squadron, the "Checkerboards" of Marine Fighter Attack Squadron 312 (VMFA-312).  In December 1992, USS Theodore Roosevelt and CVW-8 operated for the very first time in Naval Aviation history as a Special Marine Air / Ground Task Force.

Carrier Air Wing Eight embarked aboard Theodore Roosevelt in March 1993 and participated in Operation Provide Comfort and Deny Flight in support of NATO sanctions in Bosnia-Herzegovina.  In June 1993, the team passed through the Suez Canal for Red Sea duty in support of Operation Southern Watch over Iraq.  CVW-8 returned to the Adriatic Sea in July 1993 to continue NATO operational tasking until returning to Norfolk, Virginia in September 1993.

Bosnia
CVW-8 embarked again aboard Theodore Roosevelt in March 1995 and operated in the Mediterranean Sea, North Red Sea, Persian Gulf and Adriatic Sea. CVW-8 responded to threats from Iraq by conducting joint operations with the Royal Jordanian Air Force and also enforced No-Fly Zones over Bosnia-Herzegovina as part of Operation Deny Flight. On 29 August 1995, CVW-8 commenced air-to-ground offensive operations in Bosnia-Herzegovina during Operation Deliberate Force to include the first ever Navy combat use of the GBU-24  laser-guided penetrator bomb and the first combat use of the F-14 "Tomcat" to deliver air-to-ground ordnance.

This was followed by deployed operations to the North Atlantic while embarked in USS John F. Kennedy with port calls to Dublin, Ireland and Portsmouth, England.

In April 1997, CVW-8 embarked in USS John F. Kennedy for a Mediterranean Sea / Persian Gulf deployment.  During this deployment, CVW-8 participated in numerous exercises and detachments including Infinite Acclaim, Beacon Flash and Invitex.  During Invitex the Air Wing completed over 350 sorties including 203 sorties in a single day of surge operations.  This deployment also included operations over Bosnia-Herzegovina in support of Operation Deliberate Guard and over Iraq in support of Operation Southern Watch.

In January 1999 CVW-8 deployed on Theodore Roosevelt and participated in Operation Allied Force during 55 consecutive days of combat, flying 4,300 sorties, logging 10,000 flight hours and dropped 800 tons of ordnance. The Air Wing came up with new tactics utilizing cooperative targeting between F-14s and F/A-18s. CVW-8 was also the first Air Wing to expend weapons in two theaters as they headed for the Persian Gulf to support Operation Southern Watch after the war in the Balkans had ended. They flew over 2,600 missions over Iraq.

Global War on Terror
The deployment began with detachments in Tunisia, Corsica, and Israel, as well as half-dozen port-visits throughout the Mediterranean. During the second half of the deployment, the Air Wing flew in support of Operation Southern Watch expending over 29,000 lb of ordnance against Iraqi targets. USS Enterprise and CVW-8 were wrapping up operations in the Fifth Fleet area of operations on 11 September 2001, remained on station and eventually flew 16 days of combat operations over Afghanistan to include 680 sorties that delivered over 770,000 lb of precision guided munitions during the initial stages of Operation Enduring Freedom.

On 19 February 2002, the Air Wing was reassigned back to the Theodore Roosevelt Battle Group. CVW-8 made some changes as VF-14 and VF-41 had begun transitioning to the F/A-18 Super Hornet and moved to CVW-11, VF-213 (formerly CVW-11) became part of CVW-8 instead. In July 2002, CVW-8 began accelerated work-up operations leading to a combat deployment in support of Operation Iraqi Freedom.  In October 2002 CVW-8 integrated Strike Fighter Squadron Two Zero One (VFA-201), a reserve Navy FA-18A+ squadron, and embarked on USS Theodore Roosevelt in January 2003 for Caribbean training operations.  Theodore Roosevelt and CVW-8 deployed to the Mediterranean Sea in January 2003 at the conclusion of Caribbean training operations and participated in combat operations in support of Operation Iraqi Freedom flying over 1,000 sorties and 5,000 hours that delivered over 1,000,000 pounds of precision-guided weapons.  USS Theodore Roosevelt and CVW-8 returned from deployment in May 2003 and was chosen as the test platform for the Chief of Naval Operations Fleet Response Plan initiative.

In 2005, CVW-8 became the last carrier air wing to deploy with the F-14 Tomcat when it departed for the Persian Gulf with VF-31 and VF-213. Captain William Sizemore, Commander Carrier Air Wing Eight, landed the last F-14D Super Tomcat to participate in a combat mission when the last OIF line period concluded in February 2006. CVW-8 flew 16,000 sorties, logged 38,980 flight hours with a 97.3% sortie completion rate and dropped 61,000 pounds of ordnance.

CVW-8 and Theodore Roosevelt participated in Joint Task Force Exercise 08-4 Operation Brimstone off the coast of North Carolina between 21 and 31 July 2008. The British carrier , the amphibious assault ship  with associated units and the Brazilian Navy frigate Greenhalgh and the French submarine  also participated in the event.

On 8 September 2008, CVW-8 deployed on board USS Theodore Roosevelt on a regularly scheduled deployment. On 4 October, the Theodore Roosevelt Carrier Group arrived in Cape Town, South Africa, the first visit by an American aircraft carrier since 1967 and three days later the carrier left Cape Town. CVW-8 and Theodore Roosevelt supported Operation Enduring Freedom and flew more than 3,100 sorties and dropped more than 59,500 pounds of ordnance while providing Close Air Support for ISAF-forces in Afghanistan.

On 29 August 2009 Theodore Roosevelt entered Northrop Grumman Shipbuilding at Newport News, Virginia, to begin a Refueling and Complex Overhaul (RCOH) which is scheduled to last until February 2013.

On 11 May 2011, the squadrons of CVW-8 embarked on USS George H.W. Bushs maiden deployment, scheduled to conduct operations in the US 5th and 6th Fleet areas of operations.
During this deployment, CVW-8 commander Captain Jeff Davis completed his 1,000 flight deck landing ("trap") when he flew on board the carrier George H.W. Bush on 1 August 2011. CVW-8 deputy commander Captain Daniel W. Dwyer made his 1,000 trap on 18 July 2011.

Following the 2012-2013 deployment of Carrier Strike Group Three, the electronic-warfare squadron VAQ-131 was reassigned to Carrier Air Wing Eight based aboard the carrier George H.W. Bush.  This reassign was originally slated to occur in January 2014 but changing operational requirements accelerated this reassignment until immediately after the end of the 2012-2013 deployment. Finally, the squadron transitioned from the EA-6B Prowler to the EA-18G Growler electronic-warfare aircraft.

CVW-8 made its next scheduled deployment aboard George H.W. Bush in the U.S. Navy's 5th and 6th Fleet areas of responsibility from 23 January to 21 August 2017. On 18 June 2017, a F/A-18E shot down a Syrian Air Force Su-22 in the Tabqa region.  

In 2022, CVW-8 was assigned to the aircraft carrier . Fords Carrier Strike Group 12  left Naval Station Norfolk for her maiden deployment on 4 October 2022 to conduct operations and training exercises alongside NATO allies and partners throughout the Atlantic Ocean.

Current force

Fixed-wing aircraft

F/A-18E/F Super Hornet
EA-18G Growler
E-2C Hawkeye
C-2A Greyhound

Rotary wing aircraft
MH-60S Knighthawk
MH-60R Seahawk

First Carrier Air Group Eight
The air group was disestablished on 23 November 1945 following World War II. The United States Navy regards this air group as a distinct unit and therefore it is not considered part of Carrier Air Wing Eight's official lineage.

See also
 History of the United States Navy
 List of United States Navy Carrier air wings
 Carrier Strike Group 12

References

 CVW-08
Military units and formations in Virginia
Military units and formations of the United States in the Gulf War
Carrier Strike Group Two